The 2010–11 Ranji Trophy season was the 77th Ranji trophy season. It was contested through two leagues: Super and Plate. Each division was divided into 2 groups – A and B, each team played all the other teams from its group only once, either home or away.

The Super League is divided into two groups of eight and seven teams, while the Plate League is divided into two groups of six teams each. In both divisions, the top two teams from each group advance to the knock-out phase. The finalists from the Plate League are promoted to the Super League the next year while the two teams at the bottom of the Super League are relegated.

According to the new Ranji format which was implemented from 2008 to 2009 season, the top two Plate teams join three teams each from the two groups in the Super League to play a knock-out from the quarter-final stage. The new format, thus, gives a relegated side realistic chance of winning the title.

Points summary
Points in the league stages of both divisions are awarded as follows:

note* – If match ends in a draw.

Teams
For a complete list of teams which have played in the competition at some point during its history, see Ranji Trophy – Historical Note.

Super League

Group A
 Mumbai
 Delhi
 Tamil Nadu
 Bengal
 Saurashtra
 Gujarat
 Assam
 Railways

Group B
 Karnataka
 Punjab
 Uttar Pradesh
 Baroda
 Himachal
 Haryana
 Orissa

Plate League

Group A
 Hyderabad
 Rajasthan
 Madhya Pradesh
 Orissa
 Tripura
 Jharkhand (formerly known as Bihar)

Group B
 Maharashtra
 Andhra Pradesh
 Kerala
 Jammu & Kashmir
 Vidarbha
 Services

Points table

Super League
Super league – Group A

Super League – Group B

Plate League 
Plate League – Group A

Plate League – Group B

Knock-out Stage

Plate League
The two top teams from each group of the Plate league met in semi-finals, the winners of which qualified for quarter-finals of the Super league.

Super League
The top three teams of each group of the Super league along with the two winners of the semi-finals from plate league qualified for the quarter-finals.

References and notes

External links
-official website
The Ranji Trophy – Cricinfo

Ranji Trophy seasons
Ranji Trophy